Ju-Chin Chu (December 14, 1919 – November 15, 2000) was a Chinese-American chemical engineer. He was the father of Steven Chu. He was born in Liuhe, Taicang, Suzhou. Chu attended Suzhou High School, Tsinghua University and National Southwestern Associated University in China before he went to Massachusetts Institute of Technology for Ph.D. education in 1946. After graduating from MIT, he taught at Washington University in St. Louis from 1946 to 1949, at Brooklyn Polytechnic Institute from 1949 to 1966, and at Virginia Tech from 1967 to 1972. He became an Academia Sinica member in 1964.

Personal life
Ju-Chin Chu's wife Ching-Chen Li also studied at Massachusetts Institute of Technology, majoring in economics. His second born son Steven Chu is a Nobel laureate in physics and the twelfth United States Secretary of Energy in the Obama Administration. His eldest son Gilbert Chu is a professor of biochemistry and medicine at Stanford University, while the youngest Morgan Chu, is a patent lawyer who is a partner and the former Co-Managing Partner at the law firm Irell & Manella LLP.

References

1919 births
2000 deaths
American chemical engineers
Chinese emigrants to the United States
Engineers from Jiangsu
MIT School of Humanities, Arts, and Social Sciences alumni
Members of Academia Sinica
National Southwestern Associated University alumni
Polytechnic Institute of New York University faculty
Scientists from Suzhou
Tsinghua University alumni
Virginia Tech faculty
Washington University in St. Louis faculty